Agarzinsky is a rural locality (a settlement) in Chernushinsky District, Perm Krai, Russia. The population was 16 as of 2010. There are 5 streets.

Geography 
Agarzinsky is located 40 km east of Chernushka (the district's administrative centre) by road. Agarzya is the nearest rural locality.

References 

Rural localities in Chernushinsky District